Sifar (also Romanized as Şīfār, Seifar, and Seyfar; also known as Şeyghār and Şīghār) is a village in Sina Rural District, in the Central District of Varzaqan County, East Azerbaijan Province, Iran. At the 2006 census, its population was 321, in 61 families.

References 

Towns and villages in Varzaqan County